East Markham, historically also known as Great Markham, is a small village and civil parish near Tuxford, Nottinghamshire. The population of the civil parish taken at the 2011 Census was 1,160. It lies about 8 km south of Retford. It is sandwiched between the East Coast Main Line (to the east), the A1 to the west and A57 to the north.

It has a sister village, West Markham, which is smaller and on the other side of the road (old A1-B1164) between Tuxford and Markham Moor. To the south is Tuxford. East Markham has a Church of St. John the Baptist, village hall, a charity playgroup and a primary school. The Post Office closed in 1994 and after the village shop closed it re-opened with new owners in 2019. There is one remaining village pub, the Queens Hotel on High Street (the former A57). The second pub the Crown Inn closed down in approx. 2012 and was sold to developers who have turned it into a residential property. East Markham also features a playgroup, Pippins Pre-School, and a primary school. East Markham used to be home to some heavy manufacturing such as Hermans chicken factory and was historically known for its many orchards that used to surround the village, most of which closed in the 1980s (Hermans) or were replanted in the case of orchards. Small businesses which previously were physically present have now moved online including cake bakers and clothes retailers. The village also produces its own cider, by the name of Bad Apple.

Cleveland Mill was a tower windmill in East Markham, built in 1837 at a cost of £420 for the miller Thomas Lightfoot. It was 42 feet high, with four storeys and four sails. The mill was worked by wind until c. 1920. Thereafter steam or oil engines were used. The mill was owned by the Lightfoot family through most of its working life. It was sold for conversion to a house in 1976.

East Markham church had a bell ringing group that practice regularly on a Tuesday night. In 2008, Brian Hardy, the group's Tower Captain, produced a guide detailing the rich history of the bells. Their first mention was recorded in 1552 when there were three bells.

Sporting facilities include a crown green bowling club, two tennis courts, a rugby league pitch (which is home to Bassetlaw Bulldogs RLFC) and a football pitch (which is home to East Markham FC) and has a play area with a BMX track and outdoor gym equipment.

References

External links

 East Markham Primary School
 Cornelius Brown writing in 1896
 East Markham church
 Village website
 Bassetlaw Bulldogs RLFC website

Civil parishes in Nottinghamshire
Villages in Nottinghamshire
Bassetlaw District